Naval Nuclear Propulsion Information (NNPI) is a category of intellectual capital defined by the United States Navy to be "classified or unclassified information concerning the design, arrangement, development, manufacture, testing, operation, administration, training, maintenance, and repair of the propulsion plants of naval nuclear-powered ships and prototypes, including the associated shipboard and shore-based nuclear support facilities.."

Not all NNPI is classified information.  While most NNPI is sensitive, the Navy recognizes that the public has an interest in environmental, safety, and health information, and that the basic research carried out by the Navy can be useful to industry.  Unclassified information is therefore marked with the acronym "U-NNPI", but is still restricted as NOFORN.

NNPI is explicitly protected information and is not released to the general public without authority.  Those who release even NNPI-U without authority may be administratively punished, and even criminally in the case of NNPI-C.  NNPI is restricted from disclosure under the Arms Export Control Act, 22 USC §§2778 and 2794(7); such information is listed in the US Munitions List, 22 CFR §121.1, Category VI, paragraph (g).  

In some instances, small events that would normally be reported as "Events" or LOC (Loss of Control) to the Nuclear Regulatory Commission from other licensees can be classified as NNPI-C. This designation differs for similar "events" that occur on a secret network, which are referred to as "spillage".

References

 OPNAVINST N9210.3, SAFEGUARDING OF NAVAL NUCLEAR PROPULSION INFORMATION (NNPI), 6/7/2010

United States government secrecy
Classified documents
Intellectual property law
Nuclear propulsion

United States national security policy